Colin Hampton MM (1 September 1888 – 17 January 1968) was a Scottish professional footballer who played as a goalkeeper in the Football League for Chelsea and Crystal Palace. He also played in the Scottish League for Motherwell and hometown club Brechin City. He made one appearance for the Scottish League XI in 1912.

Personal life 
Hampton's second cousin Harry was also a footballer and the pair played together at Brechin City. In August 1915, one year since the outbreak of the First World War, Hampton enlisted in the Royal Field Artillery, but by December he had become a gunner in the Motor Machine Gun Service. Three months later he was promoted to corporal while serving with the 28th Battery. By 1918 he had risen to the rank of sergeant and was serving as a machine gunner in the Machine Gun Corps (Motors) in Mesopotamia. Hampton was taken prisoner by the Ottoman Army later that year when his armoured car was wrecked by shellfire. During the march to Constantinople, he and his fellow prisoners were released after the armistice was declared and he was awarded the Military Medal in 1919. He was demobilised in May 1919. After the war, Hampton ran a confectionery shop in Brechin and worked in a factory in Coventry and as a special constable during the Second World War. He died of emphysema at Stracathro Hospital in January 1968.

Career statistics

Honours 
Motherwell
 Lanarkshire Cup: 1911–12
Chelsea
 London Challenge Cup: 1919–20

References

1888 births
1968 deaths
Scottish footballers
English Football League players
Brechin City F.C. players
Motherwell F.C. players
Chelsea F.C. players
Crystal Palace F.C. players
British Army personnel of World War I
Machine Gun Corps soldiers
Scottish Football League representative players
Recipients of the Military Medal
Deaths from emphysema
Scottish Football League players
Royal Field Artillery soldiers
Association football goalkeepers
British World War I prisoners of war
World War I prisoners of war held by the Ottoman Empire
Motor Machine Gun Service soldiers
Military personnel from Angus, Scotland